San Giorgio di Piano ("St. George of the Plain") is a town and comune located in the Metropolitan City of Bologna, Emilia-Romagna, northern Italy. It is the birthplace of actress Giulietta Masina.

External links
Photo Gallery of San Giorgio di Piano